Expedition Engineering is a London-based consulting firm, delivering structural engineering services.

History

Expedition Engineering was founded in 1999 by Professor Chris Wise (engineer for the Millennium Bridge, London) and Seán Walsh, both former employees at Arup.

On 2 October 2008, Expedition's ownership was restructured, passing to an Employee Benefit Trust called the Useful Simple Trust. The Useful Simple Trust also owns Thomas Matthews, a sustainable communication design practise ; Think Up, a company specialising in engineering educational materials; Useful Simple Projects, a strategic sustainability consultant, and Useful Studio an architecture design practise.

The trustees of the Useful Simple Trust are:

 Mike Davies, founding director of the Richard Rogers Partnership
 Duncan Michael, former Chairman of Ove Arup & Partners
 Sophie Thomas, director of Thomas Matthews
 Ed McCann, director of Useful Simple Projects
 Chris Wise, director of Expedition Engineering
 Seán Walsh, director of Expedition Engineering
 Tim O'Brien, Theatre Designer

Notable projects 

Expedition Engineering's notable projects are:

 London Velodrome, London, England (2011)
 Infinity Bridge, Stockton on Tees, England (2009)
 Las Arenas Bullring, Barcelona, Spain
 55 Baker Street, London, England (2007)
 Emirates Air Line, London, England (2012)
 Stavros Niarchos Foundation Cultural Center, Athens, Greece (2015)—National Opera and National Library
Grattacielo Intesa Sanpaolo, Turin, Italy 

Expedition is working with One world Design on the design of the new Diamond Jubilee Footbridge across the Thames between Battersea and Chelsea.

The plans were submitted to the Department for Transport (DfT) at the end of July 2018, as part of the Government's plans to encourage private investment, and the DfT will respond in the autumn.

Awards 

Expedition has twice won the IStructE's Supreme Award for Structural Engineering, for the London 2012 Velodrome in 2011 and for the Infinity Bridge in 2009. 55 Baker Street also received a commendation for sustainability at the Structural Awards.

In 2012 Expedition was named Engineering Consultant of the Year at the Building Awards.

Education 

Expedition Engineering is involved in several educational projects, including Constructionarium and the Expedition Workshed website, a selection of educational tools for engineering students created by Expedition with the support of a number of other organisations.

References

External links 
 expedition.uk.com, official website 
 The Expedition Workshed, website for educational purposes 
 Useful Simple Trust, group website.

Construction and civil engineering companies of England
Engineering consulting firms of the United Kingdom
Companies based in the London Borough of Southwark
Construction and civil engineering companies established in 1999
1999 establishments in England
British companies established in 1999